Datnioides campbelli, the New Guinea tiger perch, New Guinea tigerfish or Campbell's tigerfish, is a species of datnioidid fish that is native to both fresh and brackish waters in rivers, swamps and tidal creeks in southern New Guinea, ranging from Lorentz River in Indonesia to Kikori River in Papua New Guinea.

References

Percoidei
Fish described in 1939
Freshwater fish of Papua New Guinea
Freshwater fish of Western New Guinea